The Eyes of Sibiu are the iconic eyebrow dormers on the roofs of Sibiu's houses. Sibiu lies in Transylvania, a historical region of Romania. The eyes, which are a symbol and a tourist attraction of the city, have given Sibiu the nicknames of The City with Eyes, The City Where Houses Don't Sleep and the portmanteau Seebiu. They vary in shape – most of them are trapezoid-shaped, others having rounded or elongated forms.

In Romanian, they are called Ochii Sibiului, while in German they are known as die Augen von Hermannstadt, Hermannstadt being the German name of Sibiu.

History 

Although the eyes originate from as early as the 15th century, most of them were built in the 19th century. They were most likely invented by a local of Sibiu, because they are widespread in the city and its surroundings. They are an element of Baroque architecture. Some of them were even built as late as the 20th century, after Sibiu became part of the Kingdom of Romania.

Purpose 
There are legends, according to which the eyes were built to frighten the people, making them believe they are being watched. Their real purpose was to act as a ventilation system for the houses' attics. Nowadays, the eyes have become one of Sibiu's most famous symbols, making them a tourist attraction.

In 2017, the eyes became a symbol of Romania's anti-corruption fight, being used by the organisation Vă vedem din Sibiu ("We see you from Sibiu").

Spread 

Apart from Sibiu itself, the eyes have also been built in the city's surroundings. Most of them are found in the Sibiu County. Some of them can also be found in other nearby places, like the cities of Brașov and Făgăraș, both located in the Brașov County.

Additionally, some examples which are probably unrelated can also be found in the city of Timișoara in western Romania. Similar eyebrow dormers can also be found on traditional rural Romanian houses or on cule in the historical region of Oltenia.

Gallery

See also 
 Council Tower of Sibiu
 Sibiu Lutheran Cathedral

References 

Buildings and structures in Sibiu
Baroque architecture in Romania
Windows
Roofs